Charlotte Sarah Lawrence (born June 8, 2000) is an American singer-songwriter and model.

Early life 
Lawrence was born and raised in Los Angeles. She is the daughter of actress Christa Miller and television producer Bill Lawrence. Lawrence is the grand-niece of actress Susan Saint James. Her paternal great-great-great grandfather was the real estate mogul William Van Duzer Lawrence, who was of Dutch descent. She began singing as a child. Lawrence attended Marymount High School in Los Angeles, where she was a member of volleyball and basketball teams.

Career 
Lawrence is signed to IMG Models and has appeared in magazines such as Teen Vogue and Harper's Bazaar. In March 2018, she featured on Kaskade's single "Cold as Stone". In June 2018, she released her debut EP Young.

In January 2021, Lawrence announced her second EP titled Charlotte, which was subsequently released on March 5, 2021.

Discography

Extended plays

Singles

As lead artist

As featured artist

Other appearances

References

External links

2000 births
Living people
American child singers
American female models
American women pop singers
American women singer-songwriters
IMG Models models
Lawrence family
People from Los Angeles
21st-century American singers
21st-century American women singers
American people of Dutch descent
Singer-songwriters from California